European Space Camp (ESC) is a summer camp for youths aged 17–20, which focuses on giving a hands-on experience into the field of aerospace engineering and space sciences. Participants from all over Europe and the world stay at the Andøya Space Center in Northern Norway for one week, learning from professionals and becoming amateur rocket scientists. Ultimately the goal of the camp is to launch a student sounding rocket, capable of carrying several sensors and reaching a height of 10 000m and Mach 3. Participants are divided into groups ordered with respect to their interests and work together as a team for the week-long project of launching a student rocket. Through the European Space Camp experience the young people are motivated to redirect their studies or renew their interest in the direction of science and technology.

The scientific part of the camp is divided between lectures and group work. Some of the best lecturers from across Europe lecture on topics as diverse as Rocket Physics, the work of CERN and the Northern Lights. Group work enables participants to spend a week in the life of a scientist and tackle a problem relating to the rocket launch at the end of the week. There are six groups in total: Rocket System Design, Experimental Instrumentation, Payload, Rocket Telemetry, Rocket Physics and GPS. The highlight of the week is the rocket launch, which takes place near the end of the week, with just enough time to analyse the results of the launch.

An important part of Space Camp is getting to know the other participants. As a result, a number of social activities are organised throughout the camp.

History
European Space Camp at Andøya Rocket Range was arranged for the first time in the summer of 1996. It was the Norwegian Association of Young Scientists that initiated the idea of a summer camp with this specific subject. Today the camp is made possible by the joint efforts of Andøya Space Center AS and the National Centre of Space-Related Education (NAROM), in cooperation with the Norwegian Space Centre and the European Space Agency (ESA).

The first Space Camp Andøya in 1996 was such a success that the concept was developed further each year. In 2001 Space Camp became a European event which in 2002 hosted participants from 10 different countries. European Space Camp is special with regard to subjects dealt with, the participants' real involvement in the work and what they learn during the camp. The youths at Space Camp work in groups on specific tasks which are all related to the rocket launch at the end of the camp. The students are treated as real scientists and work on advanced problems using professional equipment. The professors and scientists being around are valuable resources and helpers, leaving all the actual scientific work to the participants.

Organizers and Partners

Team Space Camp
Gaute Holen (Head)
Nina Marie Thomsen (Vice Head)
Tiia Tikkala
Inge Eide Johnsen
Anne Nijdam Svindland 
Anders Mørk

National Centre of Space-Related Education (NAROM) represented by
Arne-Hjalmar Hansen
Hege-Merethe Strømdal
Anita Hanssen

Notable guests
Alv Egeland has been a lecturer since the first camp in 1996.
Egil Lillestøl has been a lecturer since 2001.
Christer Fuglesang was a guest lecturer in 2016 for the 20th anniversary.
Andrei Borisenko was a guest lecturer 2017.
Charles Simonyi visited the camp in 2015.

References

External links
 European Space Camp official site

European Space Agency
Space organizations
Space camps